The 2003 Pan American Judo Championships in Salvador, Brasil from 2 to 9 June 2003.

Medal overview

Men's events

Women's events

Medals table

Notes

External links
 
 PJU (Official results, 1st day)
 PJU (Official results, 2nd day)
 http://www.pju.org/nuevo/respanadubra2003.htm

American Championships
Judo
2003
Sport in Salvador, Bahia
Judo competitions in Brazil
International sports competitions hosted by Brazil